Oeclidius is a genus of kinnarid planthoppers in the family Kinnaridae. There are at least 20 described species in Oeclidius.

Species
These 23 species belong to the genus Oeclidius:

 Oeclidius aboraca Fieber, 1980 c g
 Oeclidius antricola Fennah, 1980 c g
 Oeclidius browni Bourgoin & Lefebvre, 2002 c g
 Oeclidius carolus Ball, 1934 c g
 Oeclidius conopa Fennah, 1980 c g
 Oeclidius fraternus Van Duzee, 1923 c g b
 Oeclidius fulgidus (Van Duzee, 1907) c g
 Oeclidius fuscosus (Van Duzee, 1907) c g
 Oeclidius hades Fennah, 1973 c g
 Oeclidius hanabanillae Myers, 1928 c g
 Oeclidius koebelei Muir, 1934 c g
 Oeclidius luizi (Myers, 1928) c g
 Oeclidius minos Fennah, 1980 c g
 Oeclidius nanus Van Duzee, 1914 c g b
 Oeclidius nimbus Ball, 1934 c g
 Oeclidius parallelus Muir, 1934 c g
 Oeclidius pelagon Fennah, 1980 c g
 Oeclidius persephone Fennah, 1980 c g
 Oeclidius princeps Fennah, 1980 c g
 Oeclidius salaco Emeljanov & Shcherbakov, 2000 c g
 Oeclidius tenellus (Fowler, 1904) c g
 Oeclidius transversus Ball, 1934 c g
 Oeclidius trinitatis Myers, 1928 c g

Data sources: i = ITIS, c = Catalogue of Life, g = GBIF, b = Bugguide.net

References

Further reading

External links

 

Kinnaridae
Auchenorrhyncha genera